Home of the Strange is the third studio album by American alternative rock band Young the Giant, released by Fueled by Ramen on August 12, 2016.

Promotion 
On April 15, 2016, the band released "Amerika" as an announcement track to the new album. The next song to be released, "Something to Believe In", was released as the first official radio single from the album. On May 16, 2016 they announced the Home of the Strange Tour, which started in the West Coast on August 13, and toured around the US. Three additional tracks, "Titus Was Born", "Jungle Youth" and "Silvertongue", were released the weeks preceding the release of Home of the Strange.

Lyrics
Home of the Strange deals with the band's immigrant history and American identity. Lead singer Sameer Gadhia is a first generation American of Indian heritage. The track "Amerika" was inspired by Franz Kafka's unfinished novel of the same name.

Reception

Home of the Strange garnered mostly positive reviews. Entertainment Weekly commented that the band found more substance for the album: "the group ascends from the third-tier trenches that waylaid their early career, dishing out their richest and most varied project to date." Rolling Stone praised the timing of the album with the heated politics of 2016, writing "the band's third album comes at a time when hyphenated Americans are reminded daily of their status. The lyrics of Home of the Strange reflect that, taking a stance while yet referencing a complex, ongoing identity crisis." However, Rolling Stone pointed out the band's "longstanding musical identity crisis". Allmusic commented that the album was "their funkiest offering to date."

Track listing

Personnel
Sameer Gadhia - lead vocals, percussion, ukulele, organ, electric guitar
Eric Cannata - electric guitar, acoustic guitar, piano, synths, additional vocals, percussion
Francois Comtois - drums, percussion, additional vocals, piano, synths
Jacob Tilley - electric guitar, acoustic guitar, synths, vibraphone
Payam Doostzadeh - bass, piano, synths
Alex Salibian - additional electric guitar, piano, synths, vocals
Additional singers: Alexandra Govere, Gabrielle Walter-Clay, Nilu Madadi, Nora Riegels, Sonia Gadhia

Charts

Album

References 

2016 albums
Fueled by Ramen albums
Young the Giant albums